"Trigger Bang" is a song by English singer-songwriter Lily Allen, featuring English rapper Giggs. It was released on 12 December 2017 as the lead single from Allen's fourth studio album, No Shame. It is her first official release since her third studio album, Sheezus, and the first official single released by Allen since "As Long as I Got You". The song was teased and leaked a night prior to its official release.

Background
In 2015, Allen began writing songs for No Shame in a rented house in Los Angeles. Allen then set up her own studio space in London, where the majority of the album was made. Upon returning to London and setting up her studio space, Allen began associating with British rapper Giggs. Allen stated that her friendship with Giggs helped her "find her feet" during the album's initial recording process. After Allen's performance at V Festival, she traveled to Giggs' studio where she played him songs from No Shame, whilst Allen was there Giggs wrote a verse for the song "Trigger Bang".

Composition
"Trigger Bang" is a piano-tinged hip pop song that has a length of three minutes and 32 seconds. It is in the key of A flat minor, and moves at a tempo of 78 beats per minute in a 4/4 time signature. The song contains a chilled-out sound and toned-down percussion instrumental. It lyrically reminisces about growing up and battling substance abuse.

Critical reception
Robin Murray of Clash praised the song, writing that "the pairing [of Allen and Giggs] works effortlessly – Lily Allen's nonchalance versus the rapper's emphatic flow." She additionally called it "typically tongue in cheek but with whipsmart wordplay".

Music video
An accompanying music video for "Trigger Bang" directed by Myles Whittingham was released on 24 January 2018. It features the singers and depicts Allen in three different ages, with two actress portraying younger versions of her. The video also references the videos of her previous singles "LDN" and "22".

Track listing
Digital download
"Trigger Bang" – 3:32

Credits and personnel
Credits adapted from Tidal.
 Lily Allen – songwriting, vocals
 Giggs – songwriting, vocals
 Fryars – songwriting, production, recording, guitar, piano, programming, synthesizer
 Shane the Cutter – mastering
 Alexander "Smitty Beatz" Smith – mixing
 Marcello "Cool" Valenzano – mixing

Charts

Release history

References

2017 singles
2017 songs
Giggs (rapper) songs
Lily Allen songs
Parlophone singles
Songs written by Giggs (rapper)
Songs written by Lily Allen